Gini Graham Scott is an American author, songwriter, and game developer. She is also a consultant specializing in business and work relationships, conflict resolution, creativity, social issues, and criminal justice.

Scott received a Ph.D. in Sociology from the University of California in Berkeley in 1976, a J.D. from the University of San Francisco Law School in 1990, AA degrees from Merritt College in Anthropology, Social Sciences and Police Sciences in May 2001, and M.A.s in Anthropology and Mass Communications at California State University, East Bay.

She has published over 40 books on diverse subjects. She has received national media exposure for her books (including appearances on Good Morning America, Oprah, Montel Williams, CNN, and the O'Reilly Factor). She is founder and director of Changemakers Publishing, Screenworks, Songworks, and Creative Communications & Research. She hosted a weekly radio talk show series, Changemakers, featuring interviews on various topics, which aired from 1991 to 1993 to 1 million listeners in over 70 countries. She has taught classes at several colleges, including Woodbury University, Notre Dame de Namur University, and the Investigative Career Program in San Francisco.

Songwriting
Scott is a songwriter member of BMI and a member of several songwriter organizations, including the Country Music Association, Nashville Songwriting Association, and West Coast Songwriters Association. She has written over 100 songs in various genres, including country, gospel, pop, folk, and novelty songs. At least 50 have been published, and a dozen have been recorded on independent labels. She has written several songs with dog themes associated with her Do You Look Like Your Dog book, web site, and TV game/reality show.

Game and toy design
Scott has developed over two dozen games with major game companies, including Hasbro, Pressman, and Mag-Nif. She licensed Glasnost: The Game of Soviet-American Peace and Diplomacy to John N. Hansen (1988), which received a 1989 International Clio for packaging.  She was a spokesperson for Nintendo's Tetris II game in 1994, and licensed two games to Briarpatch for introduction at the American Toy Fair show in October 2006.

Bibliography

 American Murder (Praeger Pub Text October 2007) , 
 Brain Boosters : Foods & Drugs That Make You Smarter with Beverly A. Potter & Sebastian Orfali (Ronin Pub July 1993) , 
 Building a Winning Sales Team : How to Recruit, Train and Motivate the Best (Probus, McGraw-Hill August 1991) , 
 Can We Talk?: The Power and Influence of Talk Shows (Plenum 1996)
 Collect Your Court Judgement (Nolo 1999)
 Collection Techniques for Small Business (Oasis Press 1994, with John J. Harrison)
 A Complete Idiot's Guide to Party Plan Selling (Alpha Books 2005)
 The Complete Idiot's Guide to Shamanism (Alpha Books, 2002)
 The Creative Traveler: A Guidebook for All Places and All Seasons (Tudor 1989, iUniverse January 2000) , 
 Debt Collection (Oasis Press 1987)
 Disagreements, Disputes, and All-Out War : 3 Simple Steps for Dealing With Any Kind of Conflict (Amacom Books October 2007) , 
 Do You Look Like Your Dog? (Broadway Books/Random House 2004)
 Effective Selling and Sales Management (Brick House Pub Co. February 1988) , 
 The Empowered Mind: How to Harness the Creative Force Within You (Prentice Hall 1993, IUniverse 2006)
 Erotic Power : An Exploration of Dominance and Submission (Kensington Pub Corp April 1997) , 
 The Fantasy Seekers: Exploring Fantasy in Everyday Life (toExcel January 2000) , 
 Get Rich Through Multi-Level Selling (Self-Counsel Press 1989)
 Homicide by the Rich and Famous (Greenwood 2004, Berkley Books 2006)
 In the Land of Difficult People : 21 Timeless Tales Reveal How to Tame Beasts at Work (Amacom Books April 2008) , 
 Lying in Everyday Life (Harbinger House April 1991) , 
 The Magicians : A Study of the Use of Power in a Black Magic Group (Irvington Pub. April 1983) , 
 Making Ethical Choices, Resolving Ethical Dilemmas (Continuum Intl Pub Group April 1998) , 
 Mind Power (Prentice Hall 1987, IUniverse 2006)
 Mind Your Own Business: The Battle for Personal Privacy (Plenum 1995)
 The Open Door: Traveling in the U.S.S.R. (New World Library 1990).
 Positive Cash Flow : Complete Credit and Collections for the Small Business (Adams Media Corp December 1989) , 
 Private Eyes: What Private Investigators Really Do (Paladin Press September 1994) , 
 Resolving Conflict: With Others and Within Yourself (New Harbinger 1990, IUniverse 2006)
 Secrets of the Shaman: Further Explorations with the Leader of a Group Practicing Shamanism (New Falcon 1993, 2007)
 Shaman Warrior (New Falcon 1988)
 Shamanism and Personal Mastery: Using Symbols, Rituals, and Talismans to Activate the Powers Within You (Paragon House Publishers August 1991) , 
 Shamanism for Everyone (Whitford Press March 1997) , 
 The Small Business Credit and Collection Guide : Collect Overdue Bills, Establish Effective Credit Policies, and Maximize Your Cash Flow (Carol Pub Group March 1995) , 
 Success in Multi-Level Marketing (Prentice Hall 1991)
 A Survival Guide for Managing the Employee From Hell (AMACOM 2006)
 The Survival Guide for Working With Bad Bosses (AMACOM 2005)
 The Survival Guide for Working With Humans (AMACOM 2004)
 30 Days to a More Powerful Memory (AMACOM 2007)
 The Truth About Lying (Smart Publications 1994, IUniverse 2006)
 When I Grow Up I'd Like to Be a Sturgeon (Sasquatch 2007)
 Work it Right! (AMACOM 2003)
 Work With Me! Resolving Everyday Conflict in Your Organization (Davies-Black 2000)
 You the Jury : Deciding Guilt or Innocence in a Recovered Memory Case (iUniverse Inc. March 2008) ,

Notes

References

 Industry Buzz: Entering the Land of Difficult People (6/3/2008) in Lawn & Landscape 
 Writer-Entrepreneur Sells 12 Books to Major Publishers with Equery Service; Latest Book on Enjoying Work More  NewsReleaseWire.com  July 12, 2008
 Experts Debating "Tetris Syndrome"  Knight-Ridder Tribune News Service - Austin American-Statesman Pg. D-7 April 16, 1994
 Keep Your Cool at Work: A Little Perspective Goes a Long Way With Difficult Co-Workers by Patricia Sabatini - Pittsburgh Post-Gazette Sun. May 9, 2004 
 Workers Vent on Web About Bad Bosses July 12, 2006, NPR Morning Edition
 Working it Out: Fixing a Strained Relationship With Your Boss Sunday, March 2, 2007 San Francisco Chronicle 
 Surviving a Bad Boss: Certain Management Styles Can Create Real Trauma by Richard Berman Sunday, April 15, 2007 San Francisco Chronicle 
 Advice for Dealing With a Devilish Boss by Elizabeth Pezzullo July 28, 2006 The Free Lance-Star 
 Billings Woman, Pet Spotlighted in Book for Similar Looks by Cathy Ulrich February 15, 2004 Billings Gazette 
 Book Offers Workers Advise in Dealing With Bad Bosses Dec 12, 2005 The Post and Courier
 It's True: Lying's on Rise, Author Says'' March 6, 1996 The Salt Lake City Deseret News

External links
 
 Changemakers Publishing and Writing
 

Year of birth missing (living people)
Living people
University of California, Berkeley alumni
University of San Francisco alumni
Woodbury University faculty
Notre Dame de Namur University faculty
20th-century American writers
21st-century American writers
American women songwriters
21st-century American women writers
20th-century American women writers
American women academics